Anisuzzaman Khokon is a Bangladesh Nationalist Party politician and the former Member of Parliament of Mymensingh-19.

Career
Khokon was elected to parliament from Mymensingh-19 as a Bangladesh Nationalist Party candidate in 1979.

References

Bangladesh Nationalist Party politicians
Living people
2nd Jatiya Sangsad members
Year of birth missing (living people)